Sankuru District was a district of the Belgian Congo and Democratic Republic of the Congo. It went through various changes in extent, but roughly corresponded to the modern Sankuru Province.

Location

A 1914 map shows Sankuru roughly in the center of the Belgian Congo, bordered by Kasai District and Lac Leopold II District to the west, Équateur District and Aruwimi District to the north, Maniema District in the Orientale Province to the east, and Lomami District in Katanga to the south.
Sankuru District covered the upper part of the Lukenie River basin and a section of the Lubilash River, which originates further south in Lomami District.

Colonial history

Between 1910 and 1912 Kasai District was divided into Sankuru District to the northeast and a smaller Kasai District to the southwest.
As of 1926 both these districts were in the Congo-Kasaï province.

The people of the west of Sankuru District were stirred up at the end of 1919 and start of 1920 by a fetishist named Ikay, who convinced the people he could render the European weapons useless and free the people from the Belgian occupation.
Ikay's disciples spread the word to more remote areas.
In July 1920 the movement expanded greatly towards Équateur District, mostly among the Yongo people, and then among the Tomba-Nongo,  Bosongo and Booli peoples.
An administrator checking rumors of the subversion was attacked  from Ekombe, with several deaths and injuries on both sides.
Buildings in Boliko, Ikali and Monjuku were destroyed.
The rebellion spread among the Pongo and Batua people.
The people of the Lomela River basin left their villages and gathered in a desert location, refusing to obey the Belgians.

Some have said the rebellion was caused by the fetishist Ikay, but another view is that the problem came from the intermediaries of the companies and the administration who organized commerce and collected taxes in each village, and threatened the authority of the local leaders.
The intermediaries were sometimes oppressive, threatening the villagers with force unless they worked with copal and abandoned their traditional customs.
In 1928 the military showed their strength in the Lomela, Kole and Dimbelenge territories of Sankuru district.
In 1931 several villages in the district revolted.
The people of Sankuru-Edumba attacked the Forminiere II boat.
These disturbances were connected to unrest in the neighboring Lac Leopold II District.

In the reorganization of 1933, Sankuru District was expanded to include the northern part of the Lomami District, and became part of the new Lusambo Province.
The southern part of Lomami was merged into the Lualaba District in the Élizabethville Province.
In 1932–1934 the military undertook several actions in Lusambo District.
In 1936 the authorities were concerned that many talismans and magic utensils with subversive uses were appearing, particularly in the Basongo-Meno region.
The military made demonstrations of their force to put a halt to the magic propaganda and force the people back to work.

In 1947 Lusambo Province was renamed to Kasaï.
Some districts were broken up.
A 1955–1957 map shows that a new Kabinda District had been created from the southeast part of Sankuru.
Sankuru District now bordered Tshuapa District to the north, Stanleyville District to the northeast, Maniema District to the east, Kabinda District and Lulua District to the south and Kasai District to the west.

Post-independence

On 14 August 1962 Kasaï was divided into five new provinces: Lomami, Luluabourg, Sankuru, Sud-Kasaï and Unité Kasaïenne.
Governors of Sankuru during this first period as a province were:

On 25 April 1966 Luluabourg and Unité Kasaïenne were united to form Kasaï-Occidental, while Lomami, Sankuru, and Sud-Kasaï were united in the new province of Kasaï-Oriental.
Kasaï Oriental was split in 2015 into the current, smaller Kasaï-Oriental, Lomami and Sankuru provinces.

Maps

See also

Districts of the Belgian Congo
Districts of the Democratic Republic of the Congo
Sankuru

References

Sources

 / http://www.kaowarsom.be/en/online_maps

}

Further reading

Districts of the Belgian Congo